The 1929 Louisiana Tech Bulldogs football team was an American football team that represented the Louisiana Polytechnic Institute—now known as Louisiana Tech University—as a member of the Southern Intercollegiate Athletic Association (SIAA) during the 1929 college football season. Led Tod Rockwell in his second and final year as head coach, Louisiana Tech compiled an overall record of 3–4–3. The team's captain was Gale Burham.

Schedule

References

Louisiana Tech
Louisiana Tech Bulldogs football seasons
Louisiana Tech Bulldogs football